The following acts currently record for Epic Records. An asterisk (*) after the artist's name denotes that the artist no longer records for Epic.



0–9
 220 Volt
 3LW
 3T (MJJ Music/550 Music/Epic)
 21 Lil Harold (Slaughter Gang/Epic)
21 Savage (Slaughter Gang/Epic)
 T1419 (MLD Entertainment/Sony Korea/Epic)

A 
 A*M*E
 Snoh Aalegra*
 ABBA (UK/Ireland/Israel/Italy)* 
 AC/DC*
 Ace Hood
 A.CHAL*
 Adam Ant*
 After the Fire*
 The Afters*
 The Airborne Toxic Event
 Akeboshi (Japan)
 Alexandra Burke (US) (The X Factor UK contestant)
 Alexz Johnson
 Alizée
 Alkaline Trio  (Active On Epitaph)
 Melanie Amaro (The X Factor USA, season 1, contestant)
 Tori Amos*
 Anastacia
 Anggun
 Andre 3000
 The Angels
 Apollo 440 (550 Music/Epic)
 Fiona Apple (Clean Slate/Epic)
 Aqua Timez (Japan)
 Arcade*
 Argent*
 Aselin Debison
 Asian Kung Fu Generation (Japan)
 Asleep at the Wheel (Epic Nashville)
 Astro (The X Factor USA, season 1, contestant)
 Audioslave* (in association with Interscope Records)
 Augustana
 Automatic Loveletter*
 Aston Merrygold, Solo (Joint deal with Sony Music / RCA Records and Epic Records, 2009–present)

B
 B*Witched (Epic/Glowworm) 
  B2K (TUG/Epic)
 Baby D 
 Babyface (Solar/Epic)
 Bad English
 Bad Religion
 Bakers Pink
 Bachelor Girl
 Charli Baltimore (Untertainment/Epic)
 Bamboo Shoots
 Keith Barbour
 Bardo
 Sara Bareilles
 The Barron Knights
 John Barrowman (UK)
 Basia
 Beam
 Beau Nasty (WTG/Epic)
 Jeff Beck (US/Canada)
 Natasha Bedingfield (US/Canada)
 Madison Beer
 Randy Bell
 Stephanie Bentley (Epic Nashville)
 Yung Berg
 Bia
 Biddu
 Big Boi
 Blac Youngsta (Epic/CMG/Heavy Camp)*
 The Black Eyed Peas
 Black Sabbath
 Ginny Blackmore (New Zealand Artist)
 Blondie (Outside US/Canada)
 Colin Blunstone
 Bobby Shmurda*
 James Bonamy (Epic Nashville)
 Bone Thugs-n-Harmony (Ruthless/Epic)
 Bonham (WTG/Epic)
 Boston
 Boxer
 Box of Frogs
 Boy George (More Protein/Epidrome) (Central Europe)
 Brad
 Tamar Braxton
 Ally Brooke (Active on Interscope)
 Peter Brown
 Brownstone (MJJ Music/Epic) 
 Brownsville Station a.k.a. Brownsville (Epic)
 Ray Bryant
 Celeste Buckingham (Herself/Epic)
 Bernard Butler
 Jerry Butler
 Alexandra Burke (US) (The X Factor UK contestant)

C
 Camila Cabello*
 Cam'ron (Untertainment/Epic)
 Candyman
 Marcus Canty (The X Factor USA contestant)
 Cappadonna (Razor Sharp/Epic)
 Mariah Carey
 Cartel
 Cash Out (Bases Loaded/Epic)
 Cha Cha
 Keshia Chanté
 Tina Charles
 Charlie Daniels Band (Epic Nashville)
 Bill Chase
 Cheap Trick
 Chevelle*
 Bill Chinnock
 Christie
 Chris Bender
 Ciara*
 Cidade Negra
 Gigliola Cinquetti
 John Cooper Clarke
 Stanley Clarke
 The Clash
 Cleopatra
 George Clinton (550 Music/Epic)
 Cobra
 Tammy Cochran (Epic Nashville)
 Keyshia Cole
 Compton's Most Wanted
 Sarah Connor
 Alice Cooper
 Brad Cotter (Epic Nashville)
 The Cover Girls
 Beverley Craven
 Creed (Wind-Up/Epic) (outside US)
 Cry Before Dawn
 Bobbie Cryner (Epic Nashville)
 Culture Beat (550 Music/Epic)
 Culture Club (Virgin/Epic) (US)
 Cycle Sluts from Hell

D
 The D.E.Y.
 Kat Dahlia (Vested In Culture/Epic)
 The Damnwells (Epic/Rounder)
 Danger Danger (Imagine/Epic)
 Clint Daniels (Epic Nashville)
 The Dave Clark Five (US)
 John Davis & the Monster Orchestra
 Linda Davis (Epic Nashville)
 Darryl & Don Ellis (Epic Nashville)
 Howie Day
 DJ Khaled (We the Best/Epic)
 The Daylights
 Rey de la Torre
 Dead or Alive
 Death Grips*
 DDG (DDG Entertainment/Epic)
 Aselin Debison
 Jessie James Decker (Epic Nashville)
 DeeJay Punk-Roc (Independiente/Epic)
 Deep Forest
 Kat DeLuna
 Design
 Des'ree (550 Music/Epic)
 Joe Diffie (Epic Nashville)
 Dimitri Vegas & Like Mike (smash the house)
 Celine Dion (US/Japan) (550 Music/Epic)
 Disciple
 Dis-n-Dat (Epic Street)
 Divine Council
 Divine Styler (/Epic)
 Dixiana (Epic Nashville)
 Doe Boy (Epic/Freebandz/RMBG Records)
 Don Broco
 Donovan (outside UK/Ireland)
 Dope
 Downplay
 Mike Douglas
 George Duke
 Dreamcatcher (US/UK) (Dreamcatcher Company/Epic/Sony Music Entertainment Korea/Legacy)
 Duran Duran
 Droxzyfps

E
 Eazy-E (Ruthless/Epic)
 Eddie Benjamin
 Editors
 Eighteen Visions
 Electric Light Orchestra
 Elf
 Gloria Estefan/Miami Sound Machine
 Europe
 Evanescence (Wind-up/Epic)
 Jace Everett (Epic Nashville)
 Eve's Plum (550 Music/Epic)
 Example (Elliot John Gleave)
 Exile (Epic Nashville)

F
 Face To Face
 Paloma Faith
 Georgie Fame*
 Fatboy Slim (Skint/Epic) (Out of UK, US and Canada)
 Rebecca Ferguson (US) (The X Factor UK contestant)
 Fey
 Fifth Angel
 Fifth Harmony (Syco/Epic)
 Fight
 Tim Finn* (Europe)
 FireHouse*
 Five Star
 Flamin' Groovies
 Flash Cadillac & the Continental Kids
 Fleetwood Mac* (US/Canada)
 Flickerstick
 Flipp Dinero (Cinematic/Epic/We The Best)
 Nikki Flores
 Dan Fogelberg* (Full Moon/Epic)
 Ben Folds* (550 Music/Epic)
 Ben Folds Five* (550 Music/Epic)
 Freddie Foxxx (Flavor Unit/Epic)
 Franz Ferdinand (Domino/Epic) (outside Europe)
 The Fray
 Front 242
 Fromis_9 (Pledis Entertainment/Epic)
 Fuel
 Funkdoobiest (Immortal/Epic)
 Future (A1/Freebandz/Epic)
 French Montana (Epic/Bad Boy Entertainment/Coke Boys)

G
 Rosie Gaines
 Amanda Ghost
 Ghostface Killah
 Gibson/Miller Band (Epic Nashville)
 Mickey Gilley (Epic Nashville)
 Billy Gilman (Epic Nashville)
 Ginuwine
 Giveon
 G Herbo (Machine Entertainment Group/Epic/150 Dream Team/Cinematic)*
 G. Love & Special Sauce
 The Godfathers
 Bobby Goldsboro
 Good Charlotte (Daylight/Epic)*
 Delta Goodrem
 Got7 (Sony Japan)
 Grand Daddy I.U. (Cold Chillin'/Epic Street)
 Eddie Grant (Portrait/Epic)
 Macy Gray
 A Great Big World
 Adam Gregory
 LaShell Griffin
 Michael Grimm
 Groove Theory
 The Gun
 Guap Tarantino (Epic/Freebandz)

H
 Steve Hackett (Charisma/Epic) (US/Canada)
 Harold Melvin & the Blue Notes (Philadelphia International/Epic)
 Merle Haggard (Epic Nashville)
 Daryl Hall
 Roy Hamilton
 Happoradio (Epic Finland)
 Harlequin
 Jonn Hart
 Rolf Harris
 Annie Haslam (outside Japan)
 Richie Havens (Solar/Epic)
 Susan Haynes (Epic Nashville)
 Headie One
 The Head Shop
 Heart (Portrait/Epic)
 Heatwave
 Ty Herndon (Epic Nashville)
 Nick Heyward
 Bertie Higgins
 Hiroshima
 Roger Hodgson
 The Hollies (US)
 Clint Holmes
 Alonzo Holt
 Hooverphonic
 Jimmy "Bo" Horne
 Paul Horn
 James House (Epic Nashville)
 David Houston
 Jennifer Hudson
 Nipsey Hussle

I
 I-Ten* (released  Taking a Cold Look in 1983)
 Ikimono Gakari (Epic Japan)
 Imogen Heap
 Incubus (Epic/Immortal)*
 Indigo Girls*
 INXS (Burnett/Epic)*
 Iron Maiden (US)*
 The Isley Brothers*

J
 James Blunt (Warner Music UK)
 J Hus
 JB Gill Solo 
 The Jacksons
 La Toya Jackson (Private-I/Epic)
 Michael Jackson (MJJ/Epic)
 Rebbie Jackson
 Jam & Spoon
 The Jamies
 Jamiroquai
 Jean Michel Jarre
 Jefferson Airplane
 Mason Jennings
 Waylon Jennings (Epic Nashville)
 Amanda Jenssen
 Jim & Jesse (Epic Nashville)
Jidenna (Wondaland Records)
 JLS (2009–present, with a joint deal with RCA Records) (The X Factor UK contestants)
 Jodeci
 Johnny Crash (WTG/Epic)
 Alexz Johnson
 France Joli
 The Jones Girls
 George Jones (Epic Nashville)
 Kent Jones (Epidemic/We the Best/Epic)
 Bando Jonez
 Alexis Jordan (Columbia/Epic)
 Jota Quest
 Judas Priest
 July
 June's Diary*
 The Juliana Theory

K
 Kak
 Kaleidoscope
 Kah-Lo
 Kansas (Kirschner/Epic Associated)
 Karmin
 Katmandu
 Crystal Kay
 Khia
 KC and the Sunshine Band
 Keb' Mo' (OKeh/Epic)
 Kesington Kross (KES), (Epic/LaFace)
 Killer Dwarfs
 Cheyenne Kimball
 King L (Lawless Inc./Epic)
 Carole King (Ode/Epic)
 Don King
 Justin King
 Sean Kingston
 The Kinleys (Epic Nashville)
 Kool DJ Red Alert (Epic Street)
 Kool G Rap (Cold Chillin'/Epic Street)
 Korn (Epic/Immortal)*
 Josh Krajcik (The X Factor USA Season 1 Contestant)
 Kreator
 Raja Kumari

L
 Labelle
 Patti LaBelle (Philadelphia International/Epic)
 Leah LaBelle (I Am Other/Epic/So So Def)
 Shona Laing
 Lamb of God
 Miranda Lambert (Epic Nashville)
 Zara Larsson
 Lauren Jauregui * (Syco/Epic Records)
 Avril Lavigne *
 Cyndi Lauper (Portrait/Epic)
 Coco Lee
 Lemar
 Lenka
 Glenn Lewis
 Webster Lewis
 Life of Agony
 Live
 Living Colour
 Cher Lloyd * (Syco/Epic)
 Locnville
 Looking Glass
 Jennifer Lopez
 Lorentz & M.Sakarias
 Los Lonely Boys (Or/Epic) 
 Lostprophets *
 Lil Louis
 The Love Unlimited Orchestra
 Lovehammers
 Patty Loveless (Epic Nashville)
 Lene Lovich (Stiff/Epic) (US/Canada)
 Low vs Diamond
 Lulu
 Shelby Lynne (Epic Nashville)
 Louis Tomlinson
 Lil Loaded

M
 Madison Beer
 M People (US)
 Sho Madjozi
 Louise Mandrell (Epic Nashville)
 Manic Street Preachers
 Mansun*
 Margot & the Nuclear So and So's
 Brad Martin (Epic Nashville)
 Marvin and Tamara
 Mashmakhan
 Matisyahu (Or/JDub/Epic)
 Charly McClain (Epic Nashville)
 The McCoys
 George McCrae
 Ronnie McDowell (Epic Nashville)
 Malcolm McLaren
 MC Eiht (Epic Street)
 MC Ren (Ruthless/Epic)
 Meat Loaf (Cleveland International/Epic)
 Randy Meisner
 Melanie B
 Meliah Rage
 Menudo
 Metro Boomin*
 George Michael
 Midi Maxi & Efti
 Mind Funk
 Mindless Behavior
 Sal Mineo
 Liza Minnelli
 Jody Miller (Epic Nashville)
 Kate Miller-Heidke
 AJ Mitchell
 MFSB
 Modest Mouse
 Don Moen (Integrity/Epic)
 Molly Hatchet
 Mandy Moore (550 Music/Epic)
 Melba Moore
 Jane Morgan
 Motörhead
 Monsta X*
 Mtume
 Mudvayne
 Michael Martin Murphey

N
 N.W.A* (Ruthless)
 Nantucket
 Johnny Nash
 Nayobe (WTG/Epic)
 Nena
 New Hollow
 New Musik
 Nexus
 The Nolans
 John Norum
 Brandy Norwood
 Ted Nugent

O
 The O'Jays (Philadelphia International/Epic)
 Oasis (North America/Japan/Brazil)*
 Billy Ocean
 October Project
 Oh Land 
 Mike Oldfield (Virgin/Epic) (US)
 Olly Murs (The X Factor UK contestant)
 Omarion
 The Only Ones
 Open Air Stereo
 Kelly Osbourne
 Ozzy Osbourne
 Outkast (LaFace/Epic)

P
 Pages 
 Keith Palmer (Epic Nashville)
 Paloma Faith
 Ronan Parke
 Jaco Pastorius
 Patra
 Billy Paul
 Jake Paul
 Owen Paul
 Sara Paxton
 Johnny Paycheck (Epic Nashville)
 Pearl Jam
 Pegasus 
 Teddy Pendergrass
 Phantom Planet
 The Photos
 Pink Cream 69
 Poco
 Colt Prather (Epic Nashville)
 Prong
 Puffy AmiYumi (Epic Japan)

Q
 Q
 Quarterflash
 Finley Quaye
 Quietdrive
 Quiet Riot (Pasha/Epic)
 Quo (MJJ Music/Epic)

R
 Radiorama
 Rage Against the Machine
 Ram Jam
 Jon Randall (Epic Nashville)
 Shabba Ranks
 Lou Rawls
 Collin Raye (Epic Nashville)
 Matthew Raymond-Barker
 Real Boston Richey
 Red
 Redbone       
 Riff Regan
 The Remains
 Chris Rene (Syco/Epic) (The X Factor USA contestant)
 REO Speedwagon
 Revis
 Charlie Rich (Epic Nashville)
 Cliff Richard
 Minnie Riperton
 Riverdogs
 Rock Star Supernova
 The Rockfords
 Johnny Rodriguez (Epic Nashville)
 Ronnie Rogers (Epic Nashville)
 Rick Ross*
 Rowdy Rebel (GS9/Shmoney Ent/Epic)
 Rush (Japan)
 Carl Hancock Rux (550 Music/Epic)
 Tim Ryan (Epic Nashville)
 The RZA (Razor Sharp/Epic)

S
 The S.O.S. Band
 Sade (Portrait/Epic)
 Saga (Portrait/Epic)
 Sailor
 Morgan Saint
 Sanctuary
 Sarai
 Save Ferris
 Joe Satriani
 Jill Scott (Hidden Beach/Epic)
 Travis Scott
 Scouting for Girls
 Screaming Trees
 The Script
 Semi Precious Weapons
 Sepultura
 Serhat
 Shakin' Stevens
 Shakira*
 The Shamen
 Shark Island
 Vonda Shepard (550 Music/Epic)
 Sherbet
 Sho Madjozi
 The Shooters (Epic Nashville)
 Pauly Shore (WTG/Epic)
 Shudder to Think
 Silverchair
 Juliet Simms
 Carly Simon
 Jessica Simpson*
 The Sinceros
 Sister Souljah
 Ricky Skaggs (Epic Nashville)
 Skank
 Skunk Anansie
 Sly and the Family Stone
 Russell Smith (Epic Nashville)
 Snootie Wild (CMG/Epic)*
 Social Distortion
 Sons of the Desert (Epic Nashville)
 Southside (Southside Productions/Epic/808 Mafia)
 Southside Johnny & The Asbury Jukes
 Sounds Under Radio
 Spin Doctors
 Spirit (Ode/Epic)
 Joe Stampley (Epic Nashville)
 Starcastle
 Keith Stegall (Epic Nashville)
 Jim Steinman
 Tate Stevens (The X Factor USA contestant)
 Al Stewart
 Doug Stone (Epic Nashville)
 The Stranglers
 STAYC (US/UK) (HIGHUP Entertainment/Epic/Sony Music Entertainment Korea/Legacy)
 Suede
 Suicidal Tendencies
 Donna Summer
 Henry Lee Summer
 Super Furry Animals
 Billy Swan (Epic Nashville)

T

 Tall Stories
 Tanto Metro and Devonte (550 Music/Epic)
 Les Taylor (Epic Nashville)
 Livingston Taylor
 Tears for Fears
 Tease
 Teeflii
 Teena Marie
 Tenacious D
 Tony Terry
 The The
 Natasha Thomas
 Bella Thorne
 Melanie Thornton
 The Three Degrees
 Three Fish
 Tight Fit
 TLC (LaFace/Epic)
 Tokio Hotel
 Toploader
 Meghan Trainor
 The Trammps
 The Tremeloes (CBS in Europe)
 A Tribe Called Quest* (Jive/Epic)
 The Tourists (US/Canada)
 Trading Yesterday
 Tyla Yaweh
 Trainwreck
 Travis Scott (Cactus Jack Records/Epic/Grand Hustle)
T.I.(Grand Hustle/Epic)*

U
 Hikaru Utada
 USA European Connection
 U.P.O.
 Ultraspank
 Uncle Murda
 Union J (The X Factor UK contestants)

V
 Steve Vai
 Luther Vandross
 Stevie Ray Vaughan
 Vedera
 Vendetta Red
 Verbow
 Vicious
 Diana Vickers
 The Village Stompers
 Jasmine Villegas
 Vinny Cha$e
 Bobby Vinton
 VL Mike

W
 Butch Walker
 Wallpaper
 Watch the Duck
 Gene Watson (Epic Nashville)
 We Are Toonz
 Derek Webb
 Wham! (except US/Canada)
 The White Tie Affair
 Barry White
 Laura White
 "Weird Al" Yankovic
 Vanessa White (Epic US/Tawain)
 Wild Cherry
 Wild Horses (Epic Nashville)
 Marty Wilde
 Will To Power
 Gretchen Wilson (Epic Nashville)
 Edgar Winter
 Brenton Wood
 Link Wray
 Betty Wright
 Tammy Wynette (Epic Nashville)

Y
 The Yardbirds
 Yellow Magic Orchestra
 YUKI
 Yung Berg
 Yo Gotti (CMG/Epic)*

Z

Zaya
Zipper Club
Zoey Dollaz (Epic/Freebandz)

References

Epic Records
Lists of recording artists by label
 Epic